Under the Milky Way is an Australian television comedy series which first screened on community television in 2016. The series was also released as a movie in 2017.

Plot
Helene McKenzie is an avid astronomer in the observatory that overlooks the New South Wales regional town of Coonabarabran. Helene and her team of misfit colleagues actively fights its closure when a nearby and much newer observatory threatens its funding and research grant.

Cast
 Lee McClenaghan as Helene McKenzie
 Matt Stewart as Steven Eggbird
 Tom McCathie as William 'Wild Bill' Sadie
 Marty Rhone as Harry Rosenfeldt
 Kirsty Snowden as Leslie Browning
 Mark Gambino as Simon Redding
 Bryce Hardy as Mike Finch
 Rowan Francis as Mayor Darryl Barnham
 Sophie Cusworth as Halle Smith
 Davini Malcolm as Ronny McKenzie
 Kate Dehnert as Aileen
 Rob Sitch as Sam McKenzie

Awards

Antenna Awards

|-
! scope="row" rowspan="4" | 2019
| Lee McClenaghan
| Best Actor in a Narrative Drama, Comedy or Sketch
| 
|-
| Under the Milky Way
| Outstanding Theme Song in a Program
| 
|-
| Under the Milky Way
| Outstanding Creative Achievement in a Program
| 
|-
| Under the Milky Way
| Best Narrative and/or Fictional Program
|

See also
 Leongatha

References

External links
 Official Website
 Australian Television Information Archive
 

Australian community access television shows
Australian Broadcasting Corporation original programming
2016 Australian television series debuts
Australian television sitcoms